Okumu is a surname. Notable people with the surname include:

Caroline King-Okumu, geographer
Dave Okumu (born 1976), Austrian musician, songwriter, and producer
Godfrey Okumu, Kenyan volleyball coach
John Sibi-Okumu, Kenyan actor
Joseph Okumu (born 1997), Kenyan footballer